Baisari College is a college in Baisari, Banaripara Upazila, Bangladesh. The college has facility for co-education. About 200+ pupils are studying there in three departments. Recently the college has updated up to graduate level.

Schools in Barisal District